HMS LST-421 was a United States Navy  that was transferred to the Royal Navy during World War II. As with many of her class, the ship was never named. Instead, she was referred to by her hull designation.

Construction
LST-421 was laid down on 11 November 1942, under Maritime Commission (MARCOM) contract, MC hull 941, by the Bethlehem-Fairfield Shipyard, Baltimore, Maryland; launched 5 December 1942; then transferred to the United Kingdom and commissioned on 26 January 1943.

Service history 
LST-412 participated with the Royal Navy during the invasion of Sicily, the Salerno landings, the Anzio landings, and the invasion of Normandy, June 1944. 

LST-421 saw no active service in the United States Navy. She was decommissioned and returned to United States Navy custody on 29 November 1946, and struck from the Naval Vessel Register on 1 August 1947. The tank landing ship was sold to the Tung Hwa Trading Co., Singapore, on 7 October 1947 and converted for merchant service.

See also 
 List of United States Navy LSTs

Notes 

Citations

Bibliography 

Online resources

External links

 

Ships built in Baltimore
1942 ships
LST-1-class tank landing ships of the Royal Navy
World War II amphibious warfare vessels of the United Kingdom
S3-M2-K2 ships